Transportation in Vietnam is improving rapidly in terms of both quantity and quality. Especially road traffic is growing rapidly but the major roads are dangerous and slow to travel on due to outdated design and an inappropriate traffic mix. In recent years, the construction of expressways has accelerated. Air travel is also important for long distance travel. Metro systems are under construction in the two metropolises of Vietnam, Hanoi and Ho Chi Minh City.

Road transport

The total length of the Vietnamese road system is about 222,179 km with 19.0% paved, mainly national roads and provincial roads (source: Vietnam Road Administration, 2004). The national road system length is 17,295 km with 27.6% of its length paved. The provincial road system is 27,762 km of length with 23.6% paved. The road network is relatively well developed, but in poor condition. Due to congestion and lack of safety, the average speed on the national roads is a mere .

Road financing comes from a number of sources including the government, overseas donors such as the ADB, WB, JBIC and business organizations. Road investment recovery is mainly through tolls collected on bridges and roads, in accordance with laws mentioned above.

Vietnam's road system is classified according to the administrative hierarchy. Each classification is assigned a milestone color and abbreviation.

 National roads (abbreviated QL) are administered by the central government. They are marked by white milestones with red tops. On direction signs, they were historically denoted by white on blue markers, but since 2015 are denoted by black on white markers.
 Expressways or freeways (CT) are denoted by black on yellow markers on direction signs. Guide signs along expressways are green, in contrast to the blue guide signs along surface roads.
They are marked by white milestones with blue or green tops. On direction signs, they are denoted by black on white markers.
They are marked by white milestones with brown tops.
 Commune roads (ĐX) are managed by communes.
 Urban roads (ĐĐT) are managed by cities and towns.
 Certain service roads (ĐCD) may be marked by white milestones with yellow tops.

Expressways

Expressways are a rather new concept for Vietnam. Traffic is growing rapidly but the major roads are dangerous due to inappropriate design and an inappropriate traffic mix. Expressways would solve these problems along the key corridors, by separating high speed traffic from slower, local traffic.

Vietnam currently recognizes two classes of expressway. Both have a minimum of two lanes in each direction, but Class A has grade separated interchanges, while Class B has at-grade intersections. There are 4 design-speed categories: 60, 80, 100 and 120 km/h. Generally all cars, buses and trucks are permitted on the expressway but công nông (agricultural vehicles) and all types motorcycles are not.

Road vehicles
Motorbikes
Vietnam is renowned for its motorbike culture. In 1995, over 90% of trips in both Hanoi and Saigon were done by motorcycle. In 2017, 79% of Vietnamese reported using a motorbike regularly. With 45 million registered motorbikes on a 92 million population headcount, Vietnam has one of the highest motorbike ownership rates worldwide. Vietnam is the 4th largest market for motorbike sales, after China, India and Indonesia. 87% of Vietnamese households own a motorbike, a number only surpassed by Thailand.

In recent years, the government has expressed the desire to reduce the number of motorbikes in an effort to curb congestion.

Cars
As of 2015, 2 million passenger cars were registered.

Car prices are kept high by import taxes and sales tax, which put Vietnam as one of the most expensive countries to buy a car, with up to 2 or 3 times the final price consisting of taxes and fees. In 2016, a Lexus LX was priced at 7.3 billion VND (USD 315,000), a Toyota Innova at 800 million VND (USD 35,000), Despite this, car sales are growing at double digit rates each year.

Water transport

Ferries

Most river crossings have long been replaced by bridges, however ferry crossings still operate for vehicles not allowed on expressways.

 Cat Lai ferry, between Ho Chi Minh City and Long Thanh, crossing the Dong Nai River.
 Between Ho Chi Minh City and Vung Tau, a high-speed passenger ferry service is available.

Ports and harbors
 Cam Ranh – large deep water port and used by Marco Polo during his voyages to China; formerly a major military facility for the U.S. Army and US Navy during the 1960s; later used by the Soviet Navy and the Vietnamese Navy
 Da Nang – Tien Sa seaport is the third largest sea port in Vietnam after Ho Chi Minh City and Hai Phong; handles 3-4 million tons of cargo annually
 Hai Phong
 Ho Chi Minh City - Saigon Port
 Hong Gai
 Qui Nhơn
 Nha Trang
 Nghi Son (Thanh Hóa)
 Son Duong (Hà Tĩnh)
 Dung Quất (Quảng Ngãi)
 Vũng Tàu

Vietnam has 17,702 km of waterways; 5,000 km of which are navigable by vessels up to 1.8 m draft.

Merchant marine
 Total: 579 ships (1,000 GT or over)
 Ships by type: barge 1, bulk 142, cargo 335, chemical tanker 23, container 19, liquified gas 7, passenger/cargo 1, petroleum tanker 48, refrigerated cargo 1, roll on/roll off 1, specialized tanker 1
 Registered in other countries: 86 (Cambodia 1, Kiribati 2, Mongolia 33, Panama 43, Taiwan 1, Tuvalu 6) (2010)

Air transport
Air travel is rapidly increasing in importance. The route between Hanoi and Ho Chi Minh City has been world's 7th busiest airline route by seat capacity since 2016.

Airports

Vietnam operates 37 civil airports, including three international gateways: Noi Bai serving Hanoi, Da Nang serving Da Nang City, and Tan Son Nhat serving Ho Chi Minh City. Tan Son Nhat is the largest, handling 75 percent of international passenger traffic. Vietnam Airlines, the national airline, has a fleet of 82 aircraft that link Vietnam with 49 foreign cities. The second largest domestic carrier is VietJet Air, serving 16 domestic destinations and 5 international destinations, and third largest is Bamboo Airways.

Airports with civil service
Total : 37
Airports with runways over 3,047 m : 9
Airports with runways from 2,438 to 3,047 m :6
Airports with runways from 1,524 to 2,437 m :13
Airports with runways from 914 to 1,523 m   :9

Heliports
Total: 1

Railways 

The national railway network uses mainly , although there are several  and mixed gauge lines in the North of the country. There were 278 stations on the Vietnamese railway network as of 2005, most of which are located along the North–South line. The Vietnamese railway network is owned and operated by the state-owned enterprise Vietnam Railways (VNR), which operates a number of different subsidiaries involved in construction, communications, training, and other activities connected to railway maintenance.

The overall condition of railway infrastructure in Vietnam varies from poor to fair; most of the network remains in need of rehabilitation and upgrading, having received only temporary repair from damages suffered during decades of war. A joint Japanese-Vietnamese evaluation team found that the poor state of railway infrastructure was the fundamental cause for most railway accidents, of which the most common types are train crashes against vehicles and persons, especially at illegal level crossings; derailments caused by failure to decrease speed was also noted as a common cause of accidents.

International railway links 
People's Republic of China
Two railways connect Vietnam to the People's Republic of China: the western Yunnan–Vietnam Railway, from Haiphong to Kunming, and the eastern railway from Hanoi to Nanning. The railway into Yunnan is a metre gauge line, the only such line to operate inside China; it may, however, be converted to standard gauge. Railway service along the Chinese portion of the route is currently suspended. Cross-border service was available until 2002, when floods and landslides, which frequently caused delays along the route, caused serious damage to the tracks on the Chinese side. Hanoi–Đồng Đăng Railway access to Nanning is done through the border at Đồng Đăng, in Lạng Sơn Province. Regular service generally entails stopping at the border, changing from a Vietnamese metre-gauge train to a Chinese standard-gauge train, and continuing on to Nanning.

The Yunnan–Vietnam Railway will form the Chinese part of the Singapore-Kunming Rail Link, which is expected to be completed in 2015.

Cambodia and Laos
There are currently no railway connections between Vietnam and Cambodia or Laos. As part of plans established by ASEAN, however, two new railways are under development: Saigon–Lộc Ninh Railway connecting Ho Chi Minh City to Phnom Penh, Cambodia, and one connecting the North–South Railway to Thakhek in Laos. The Vietnamese portion of the Phnom Penh railway would begin with a junction of the North–South Railway at Dĩ An Railway Station, and would end in Lộc Ninh, Bình Phước Province, close to the Cambodian border, linking up with a similar project on the Cambodian side. According to the plan established by ASEAN, this stretch is scheduled for completion by 2020; it will form part of the Kunming–Singapore railway project, overseen by the ASEAN–Mekong Basin Development Cooperation (AMBDC). Vientiane - Vũng Áng Railway would run between Vung Ang, a port in Hà Tĩnh Province, to connect with the North–South Railway at Tân Ấp Railway Station in Quảng Bình Province, then crossing through the Mụ Giạ Pass towards Thakhek. According to plans established by ASEAN, the line may then be extended via Thakhek all the way to the Laotian capital Vientiane. Both Laos and Thailand have expressed interest in the project as a shorter export gateway to the Pacific Ocean.

High-speed rail 
North–South Express Railway

Once completed, the high-speed rail line—using Japanese Shinkansen technology—would allow trains to complete the Hanoi–Ho Chi Minh City journey in less than six hours, compared to around 30 hours taken on the existing railway. Vietnamese prime minister Nguyễn Tấn Dũng had originally set an ambitious target, approving a  line to be completed by 2013, with 70 percent of funding (initially estimated at US$33 billion) coming from Japanese ODA, and the remaining 30 percent raised through loans. Later reports raised estimated costs to US$56 billion (almost 60 percent of Vietnam's GDP in 2009) for a completion date in the mid-2030s. On June 19, 2010, after a month of deliberation, Vietnam's National Assembly rejected the high speed rail proposal due to its high cost; National Assembly deputies had asked for further study of the project.

In 2018 a new feasibility study was submitted and based on that the government wants to reconsider the cost-benefit of the project. Plans show the first phase of construction to build sections between Hanoi and Vinh, and simultaneously between Ho Chi Minh City and Nha Trang both to be finished by 2032 with the entire north-south link to be finished by 2045.

Ho Chi Minh City–Cần Thơ Express Railway

Another high-speed rail has been proposed to connect Ho Chi Minh City to Southeast Vietnam and Can Tho.

Metro 

The two biggest cities in Vietnam, Hanoi and Saigon, with Ho Chi Minh City Metro (Saigon) currently under construction, both projects have suffered from delays, budget deficits and budget overruns. The Hanoi metro system began operations on November 6, 2021, and the Ho Chi Minh City Metro is expected to be opened in 2024.

Pipelines
In April 1995, a 125-kilometer natural gas pipeline connecting Bach Ho with a power plant near Vũng Tàu went into operation. With the subsequent addition of compressors, the volume pumped rose to more than 1 billion cubic meters per year. In 2005 a 399-kilometer underwater pipeline, the world's longest, began to carry natural gas onshore from the Nam Con Son basin. The pipeline's anticipated capacity is 2 billion cubic meters per year, while the basin has an estimated 59 billion cubic meters of natural gas reserves.  Vietnam has 28 km of condensate pipeline, 10 km of condensate/gas pipeline, 216 of natural gas line, and 206 km of pipeline for refined products.

See also

 North–South Express Railway (Vietnam)
 North–South Expressway (Vietnam)
Motorcycle industry in Vietnam

References

Further reading

External links

 Ministry of Transport, Vietnam

Maps 
 World Bank transport map
 UN Map

 

bn:ভিয়েতনাম#পরিবহন ব্যবস্থা